The Uganda national football team represents Uganda in association football and is controlled by the Federation of Uganda Football Associations.

History
It made its debut on 1 May 1926 against Kenya drawing 1–1. It qualified for its debut in the Africa Cup of Nations in 1962, the third edition of the tournament, which included only 4 teams. In the semi-finals, it was defeated and eliminated by United Arab Republic (2–1), and then lost the third place match against Tunisia (3–0).

It returned to the Africa Cup of Nations in 1974, where it was eliminated in the first round following 2 defeats against Egypt and Zambia and a draw against Ivory Coast. It was eliminated in the first round in the 1976 edition, being defeated by Ethiopia, Egypt and Guinea.

In the 1978 Africa Cup of Nations, it finished second in the group stages defeating Congo (3–1) and Morocco (3–0) and lost 3–1 to Tunisia. In the semi-finals it eliminated Nigeria (2–1) and in the final was defeated by Ghana (2–0).

In 2017 it qualified for the African Cup of Nations again after 39 years. It finished the tournament in the first round after 2 1–0 losses to Ghana and Egypt and a 1–1 draw against Mali.

In the qualifiers for the 2018 World Cup, it progressed to the second round with a 4–0 aggregate win against Togo, and was drawn into a group with Egypt, Ghana and the Republic of Congo. It finished the group with 2 0–0 draws against Ghana, a win and a draw against the Republic of Congo and a victory against Egypt followed by a defeat at the home of the Pharaohs. The 9 points won were not enough for it to qualify against the 13 of the Egyptians who finished first in the standings.

In the qualifiers for the 2019 Africa Cup of Nations, it cruised through qualifiers against Tanzania, Cape Verde and Lesotho. In the competition proper, a 2–0 victory against DR Congo meant that it had won its first match in the competition for 41 years. In the other 2 games of the group Uganda obtained a draw against Zimbabwe (1–1) and a defeat against the hosts Egypt (2–0) qualifying in second place, to be eliminated in the round of 16 by Senegal (1–0).

Results and fixtures

2022

2023

Coaching staff

Coaching history
Interim coaches are listed in italics.

  Alan Rogers (1965–1966)
  Robert Kiberu (19??–1969)
  Burkhard Pape (1969–1972)
  David Otti (1973–1974)
  Otto Westerhoff (1974–1975)
  Peter Okee (1976–1981)
  Bidandi Ssali (1982)
  Peter Okee (1983)
  George Mukasa (1984–1985)
  Barnabas Mwesiga (1986–1988)
  Robert Kiberu (1988–1989)
  Polly Ouma (1989–1995)
  Timothy Ayieko (1995–1996)
  Asuman Lubowa (1996–1999)
  Paul Hasule (1999)
  Harrison Okagbue (1999–2001)
  Paul Hasule (2001–2003)
  Pedro Pasculli (2003)
  Leo Adraa (2003–2004)
  Mike Mutebi (2004)
  Mohammed Abbas (2004–2006)
  Csaba László (2006–2008)
  Bobby Williamson (2008–2013)
  Milutin Sredojević (2013–2017)
  Moses Basena and  Fred Kajoba  (2017)
  Sébastien Desabre (2017–2019)
  Abdallah Mubiru (2019)
  Johnny McKinstry  (2019–2021)
  Abdallah Mubiru (2021)
  Milutin Sredojević (2021–)

Players
Players were called up for the 2023 Africa Cup of Nations qualification matches.
 Match date: 4 and 8 June 2022
 Opposition:  and 
 Caps and goals correct as of: 8 June 2022, after the match against Niger

The following players have been called up in the last 12 months.

DEC Refused to join the team after the call-up.
INJ Withdrew due to an injury.
PRE Preliminary squad.
RET Has retired from international association football.
SUS Suspended from the team.
WD Withdrew.

Player records

Players in bold are still active with it.

Competitive record

FIFA World Cup

Africa Cup of Nations

African Nations Championship

African Games

CECAFA Cup

1926: 2nd place

1928: 1st place

1929: 1st place

1930: 1st place

1931: 2nd place

1932: 1st place

1935: 1st place

1936: 1st place

1937: 1st place

1938: 1st place

1939: 1st place

1940: 1st place

1941: 2nd place

1942: 2nd place

1943: 1st place

1944: 2nd place

1945: 1st place

1946: 2nd place

1947: 1st place

1948: 1st place

1949: 3rd place

1950: 3rd place

1951: 3rd place

1952: 1st place

1953: 2nd place

1954: 1st place

1955: 1st place

1956: 1st place

1957: 1st place

1958: 2nd place

1959: 3rd place

1960: 1st place

1961: 3rd place

1962: 1st place

1963: 1st place

1964: 3rd place

1965: 3rd place

1966: 2nd place

1967: 2nd place

1968: 1st place

1969: 1st place

1970: 1st place

1971: 2nd place

1973: 1st place

1974: 1st place

1975: 3rd place

1976: 1st place

1977: 1st place

1978: 4th place

1979: 7th place

1980: Did not enter

1981: 4th place

1982: 1st place

1983: 3rd place

1984: 3rd place

1985: 4th place

1987: 3rd place

1988: 8th place

1989: 1st place

1990: 1st place

1991: 3rd place

1992: 1st place

1994: 1st place

1995: 2nd place

1996: 1st place

1999: Quarter-finals

2000: 1st place + 2nd place

2001: 7th place

2002: 4th place

2003: 1st place

2004: 5th place

2005: 4th place

2006: 4th place

2007: 3rd place

2008: 1st place

2009: 1st place

2010: 3rd place

2011: 1st place

2012: 1st place

2013: Quarter-finals

2015: 1st place

2017: 2nd place

2019: 1st place

2021: 6th place

2023: TBD

Other tournaments

Head-to-head record
Completely updated and corrected per the cited source on 4 July 2017

References

External links

Federation Of Uganda Football Associations
Uganda at FIFA.com

African national association football teams